Father Anatoly Tikhai was a hieromonk who went to Japan in the early 1870s to assist Fr. Nicholas in his missionary work in Japan. Initially, the future St. Nicholas of Japan assigned Fr. Anatoly to his original church in Hakodate on Hokkaido island in northern Japan. During his years in Japan before he returned to Russia due to illness, Archimandrite Anatoly organized and taught schools in Hakodate and Osaka as well as serving as dean of the language school and organizing the Tokyo Orthodox Seminary in Tokyo.

Life 
Fr. Anatoly was originally from Bessarabia. He was born 23 November 1839 in Tărăsăuţi, Hotin district (later known as Khotinsky Uyezd) in the northern part of Moldova (Bessarabia). He graduated from Chişinău Theological Seminary and from Kiev Theological Academy. He lived on Mount Athos for four years before he was assigned to assist Fr. Nicholas with his mission work in Japan.

The hieromonk Anatoly arrived in Japan during December 1871 while Fr. Nicholas' activities were still centered in Hakodate. After reviewing the status of the missionary effort in Japan with Fr. Anatoly, Fr. Nicholas assigned Fr. Anatoly to the existing parish at Hakodate, thus continuing the community that had formed there. This allowed Fr. Nicholas to move his activities to Edo (Tokyo). 

In 1873, Fr. Anatoly established the Motomachi Orthodox Primary School in Hakodate where he taught for the next seven years.  By 1880, the school had an enrollment of 300. In 1880, Fr. Anatoly was raised to the rank of Archimandrite and also was called by Bp. Nicholas to come to the Kanda Surugadai headquarters in Tokyo to become the dean of the language school and the newly organized seminary.  Here he taught theology to the seminarians and assisted Bp. Nicholas. As the Mission expanded, Fr. Anatoly was assigned in 1882 to organize a mission school in Osaka.

In the late 1880s Archimandrite Anatoly's health began to fail, and in the summer of 1890 he returned to Russia where he reposed in 1893.

See also
Yakov Tikhai

External links
 MISIONARI ŞI APOSTOLI ORTODOCŞI ROMÂNI ÎN JAPONIA SECOLULUI XIX

References

1839 births
1893 deaths
People from Chernivtsi Oblast
Athonite Fathers
Members of the Romanian Orthodox Church
Eastern Orthodox missionaries
Romanian Christian missionaries
Romanian expatriates in Japan
Orthodox Church in Japan
Christian missionaries in Japan
Kiev Theological Academy alumni
People from Khotinsky Uyezd